Mateja Maslarević (born 12 October 2000) is a Serbian footballer who plays for Metalac GM.

Career statistics

References

External links
 
 

2000 births
Sportspeople from Čačak
Living people
Association football goalkeepers
Serbian footballers
FK Borac Čačak players
FK Metalac Gornji Milanovac players
Serbian First League players
Serbian SuperLiga players